The 2014 Pac-12 Conference men's soccer season was the 15th season of men's varsity soccer in the conference. 
The defending champions are the UCLA Bruins.

Changes from 2013

Season outlook

Preseason rankings 

This will be released in August 2014.

Teams

Stadia and locations

Standings 

As of October 25, 2013

Results

Statistics

Honors

2014 Pac-12 Men’s Soccer Players of the Week

See also 

 Pac-12 Conference
 2014 NCAA Division I men's soccer season
 2014 in American soccer
 2013 Pac-12 Conference men's soccer season

References 

 
2014 NCAA Division I men's soccer season